Nikolay Orlov may refer to:
Nikolay Alexeyevich Orlov (1827–1885), Russian diplomat
Nikolai Orlov (painter) (1863–1924), Russian painter
Nicholas W. Orloff (1890s–1961), Russian-American spy
Nikolai Orlov (pianist) (1892–1964), Russian pianist
Nikolay Orlov (wrestler) (fl. 1900s), Russian wrestler
Nicholas Orloff (dancer) (1914/15–2001), Russian-American ballet dancer
Nikolai Stepanovich Orlov (1871 – after 1917), Russian deputy of the Fourth Imperial Duma